209P/LINEAR is a periodic comet discovered on 3 February 2004 by Lincoln Near-Earth Asteroid Research (LINEAR) using a  reflector. Initially it was observed without a coma and named 2004 CB as a minor planet or asteroid, but in March 2004 Robert H. McNaught observed a comet tail which confirmed it as a comet. It was given the permanent number 209P on 12 December 2008 as it was the second observed appearance of the comet. Prediscovery images of the comet, dating back to December 2003, were found during 2009. Arecibo imaging in 2014 showed the comet nucleus is peanut shaped and about 2.4 km in diameter. The comet has extremely low activity for its size and is probably in the process of evolving into an extinct comet.

209P/LINEAR was recovered on 31 December 2018 at magnitude 19.2 by Hidetaka Sato, but not officially announced yet.

2014 passage
209P/LINEAR came to perihelion (closest approach to the Sun) on 6 May 2014. On 29 May 2014 the comet passed  from Earth, but only brightened to about apparent magnitude 12. The 2014 Earth approach was the 9th closest known comet approach to Earth.

Associated meteor showers
Preliminary results by Esko Lyytinen and Peter Jenniskens, later confirmed by other researchers, predicted 209P/LINEAR might generate the next big meteor shower which would come from the constellation Camelopardalis on the night of 23/24 May 2014. It was possible that there could be 100 to 400 meteors per hour. All the trails from the comet from 1803 through 1924 were expected to intersect Earth's orbit during May 2014. The peak activity was expected to occur around 24 May 2014 7h UT when dust trails produced from past returns of the comet could pass  from Earth. The 2014 Camelopardalids only generated 10–15 visual meteors per hour. But the expected radiant and date of visual maximum were correctly predicted. The shower peaked around 6h UT on 24 May 2014. The Canadian Meteor Orbit Radar (CMOR) detected the shower using HF/VHF radar echos but the particles were too small for visual detection. Earth will encounter the 1939 stream around 24 May 2019 8h UT with a ZHR of ~5. The Eta Aquariids also occur at this time of year.

209P/LINEAR may also be the source of the weak 6–14 June meteor shower "sigma Ursae Majorids" (SIM #677).

References

External links 
 Orbital simulation from JPL (Java) / Horizons Ephemeris
 209P/LINEAR – Seiichi Yoshida @ aerith.net
 Elements and Ephemeris for 209P/LINEAR – Minor Planet Center
 209P/LINEAR at the Minor Planet Center's Database
 209P/LINEAR – Kazuo Kinoshita (Dec. 21, 2008 )
 Camelopardalids 2014: First Results
 May Camelopardalids (SETI Institute / Peter Jenniskens)
 May Camelopardalids Fireball as seen from Pennsylvania via NASA Meteor Watch on Facebook
 How Scientists Chased a New Meteor Shower from the Sky (Space.com June 10, 2014)
 May Camelopardalids (MCM) May 24 2019 by CMOR radar
 Meteor activity related to 209P/LINEAR by worldwide radio meteor observations (2022)

Periodic comets
209P
0209

Meteor shower progenitors
May events
20040203